Ernest Gravier (26 August 1892 – 14 March 1965) was a French footballer. He competed in the men's tournament at the 1924 Summer Olympics.

References

External links
 

1892 births
1965 deaths
French footballers
France international footballers
Olympic footballers of France
Footballers at the 1924 Summer Olympics
Sportspeople from Allier
Association football defenders
Footballers from Auvergne-Rhône-Alpes